Michael Carson is the pen name of British author Michael Wherly.  He is best known for his Benson trilogy of novels, about a young man growing up Catholic and homosexual.

Childhood and education
Carson was born in 1946 in Wallasey, in the north-west of England.  He was brought up as a devout Catholic.

After attending Aberystwyth and Oxford universities, and training at International House World Organisation in London, he spent twenty years teaching English as a Foreign Language primarily in the Arab world.  He has lectured in writing at Liverpool John Moores University, the University of Liverpool and the University of Lancaster.   He mentors for Crossing Borders, a project to encourage African writers.  Carson won the Writers Inc prize in 2006 for his story All over the Place.

He has also worked as a lifeguard.

Short stories
Carson released a collection of short stories in 1993, Serving Suggestions, published by Victor Gollancz, which includes "The Punishment of Luxury". A further collection of short stories, The Rule of Twelfths, was published by Headland in May 2008.  Fifty short stories by Michael Carson have also featured on BBC Radio Four.

Novels

Benson trilogy
Sucking Sherbet Lemons  
Stripping Penguins Bare 
Yanking Up The Yoyo     
Benson at Sixty (2011)

Other novels
Friends and Infidels    
Coming Up Roses         
Demolishing Babel       
Dying in Style          
Hubbies                 
The Knight of the Flaming Heart 
 The Rule of Twelfths and Other Stories

References

External links

British writers
1946 births
Living people
People from Wallasey
Alumni of Aberystwyth University
Academics of Liverpool John Moores University
Academics of the University of Liverpool
Academics of Lancaster University